Joseph P. Kennedy Sr. (1888–1969) was a United States businessman and political figure, and father of John F. Kennedy.

Other Josephs in his family:
Joseph P. Kennedy Jr. (1915–1944), oldest son of Joseph P. Kennedy, Sr.
Joseph P. Kennedy II (born 1952), oldest son of Senator and Attorney General Robert F. Kennedy, and former representative from Massachusetts, 1987–1999
Joe Kennedy III  (born 1980), son of Joseph P. Kennedy II and representative from Massachusetts, 2013–2021

Joseph Kennedy may also refer to:

Politics 
Joseph C. G. Kennedy (1813–1887), Whig politician, lawyer and journalist from Pennsylvania who supervised the U.S. Census for 1850 and 1860
Joseph Phillip Kennedy, Chief justice of the Supreme Court of Nova Scotia
Joseph L. Kennedy (born 1971), American businessman and candidate in the 2010 United States Senate special election in Massachusetts
Joe Kennedy (Georgia politician) (1930–1997), American politician from Georgia

Sports 
Joe Kennedy (baseball) (1979–2007), American baseball pitcher
Joe Kennedy (footballer) (1925–1986), English professional footballer
Joe Kennedy (basketball) (born 1947), American basketball player for the Seattle SuperSonics
Pat Kennedy (Joseph Patrick Kennedy, born 1952), American basketball coach
Joseph A. Kennedy, football coach and plaintiff in the U.S. Supreme Court case Kennedy v. Bremerton School District

Other 
X. J. Kennedy (Joseph Charles Kennedy, born 1929), American writer
Joseph W. Kennedy (1916–1957), co-discoverer of the element plutonium
Joe Kennedy Jr. (1923–2004), American jazz violinist
Joseph Kennedy (actor) (born 1981), English actor
Joseph Kennedy (professor), professor of polymer science and chemistry

See also
 Jo Kennedy (born 1962), Australian actress